Johann Heinrich Beck (September 12, 1856 – May 26, 1924) was an American composer and conductor. Born in Cleveland, Ohio, he wrote a number of pieces for orchestra, as well as a string sextet and a string quartet. He also gave music composition instruction to African-American opera composer Harry Lawrence Freeman.

He died in Cleveland on May 26, 1924, aged 67.

References

External links
 Collection of Music Manuscripts of Johann H. Beck at Cleveland Public Library. According to the guide, the collection contains the "music manuscripts of Cleveland composer and conductor, Johann H. Beck, as well as letters, clippings, books, notes, and memorabilia."

1856 births
1924 deaths
American male composers
American composers
Musicians from Cleveland